Kristian Tettli Rennemo (born November 1, 1984) is a Norwegian cross-country skier who competed between 2004 and 2015. His best FIS Cross-Country World Cup finish was a win in a 4 × 10 km relay event in Finland in March 2010 at the 2009–10 FIS Cross-Country World Cup.

Cross-country skiing results
All results are sourced from the International Ski Federation (FIS).

World Cup

Season standings

Team podiums

 1 victory – (1 ) 
 1 podium – (1 )

References

External links

1984 births
Living people
Norwegian male cross-country skiers
Sportspeople from Trondheim